The 1980 NCAA Division I-AA Football Championship Game was a postseason college football game between the Eastern Kentucky Colonels and the Boise State Broncos. The game was played on December 20, 1980, at Hughes Stadium in Sacramento, California. The culminating game of the 1980 NCAA Division I-AA football season, it was won by Boise State, 31–29.

The game was also known as the Camellia Bowl, a name that had been used starting in 1961 for various NAIA and NCAA playoff games held in Sacramento. The Colonels, defending champions from 1979, became the first program to play in a second I-AA title game.

Teams
The participants of the Championship Game were the finalists of the 1980 I-AA Playoffs, which began with a four-team bracket.

Eastern Kentucky Colonels

Eastern Kentucky finished their regular season with a 9–2 record (5–2 in conference); their losses were to Western Kentucky and Akron. Ranked third in the final AP Poll for I-AA, the Colonels were the at-large selection to the four-team playoff; they defeated Lehigh, the East selection, by a score of 23–20 to reach the final. This was the second appearance for Eastern Kentucky in a Division I-AA championship game, having won in 1979.

Boise State Broncos

Boise State finished their regular season with an 8–3 record (6–1 in conference); their conference loss was to Montana State, with non-conference losses to Southeastern Louisiana and Division II program Cal Poly. Ranked seventh in the final AP Poll for I-AA, the Broncos were the West selection to the playoff; they defeated Grambling State, the South selection, by a 14–9 score to reach the final. This was the first appearance for Boise State in a Division I-AA championship game.

Game summary
Trailing 24–22 late in the fourth quarter, Eastern Kentucky scored a touchdown on a 60-yard pass completion with only 55 seconds left in the game, taking a 29–24 lead. Boise State then went 80 yards in 43 seconds for the final points of the game, winning 31–29.

Note: contemporary news reports listed attendance as 10,000; NCAA records indicate 8,157.

Scoring summary

Game statistics

See also
 1980 NCAA Division I-AA football rankings

References

Further reading

External links
 Boise State 1980 reunion (April 11, 2008) via YouTube

Championship Game
NCAA Division I Football Championship Games
Boise State Broncos football games
Eastern Kentucky Colonels football games
American football in Sacramento, California
Sports competitions in Sacramento, California
NCAA Division I-AA Football Championship Game
20th century in Sacramento, California
NCAA Division I-AA Football Championship Game